Earth observation (EO) is the gathering of information about the physical, chemical, and biological systems of the planet Earth. It can be performed via remote-sensing technologies (Earth observation satellites) or through direct-contact sensors in ground-based or airborne platforms (such as weather stations and weather balloons, for example). 

According to the Group on Earth Observations (GEO), the concept encompasses both "space-based or remotely-sensed data, as well as ground-based or in situ data". Earth observation is used to monitor and assess the status of and changes in natural and built environments.

Terminology

In Europe, Earth observation has often been used to refer to satellite-based remote sensing, but the term is also used to refer to any form of observations of the Earth system, including in situ and airborne observations, for example. The GEO, which has over 100 member countries and over 100 participating organizations, uses EO in this broader sense.

In the US, the term remote sensing was used since the 1960s to refer to satellite-based remote sensing. Remote sensing has also been used more broadly for observations using any form of remote sensing technology, including airborne sensors and even ground-based sensors such as cameras. Perhaps the least ambiguous term to use for satellite-based sensors is satellite remote sensing (SRS), an acronym which is gradually starting to appear in the literature.

Types
Earth observations may include:
 numerical measurements taken by a thermometer, wind gauge, ocean buoy, altimeter or seismometer
 photos and radar or sonar images taken from ground or ocean-based instruments
 photos and radar images taken from remote-sensing satellites
 decision-support tools based on processed information, such as maps and models

Applications
Just as Earth observations consist of a wide variety of possible elements, they can be applied to a wide variety of uses. Some of the specific applications of Earth observations are:
 forecasting weather
 tracking biodiversity and wildlife trends
 measuring land-use change (such as deforestation)
 monitoring and responding to natural disasters, including fires, floods, earthquakes, landslides, land subsidence and tsunamis
 managing natural resources, such as energy, freshwater and agriculture
 addressing emerging diseases and other health risks
 predicting, adapting to and mitigating climate change

Trends
The quality and quantity of Earth observations continue to mount rapidly. In addition to the ongoing launch of new remote-sensing satellites, increasingly sophisticated in situ instruments located on the ground, on balloons and airplanes, and in rivers, lakes and oceans, are generating increasingly comprehensive, nearly real-time observations.

In 2017  Earth observation have become increasingly technologically sophisticated. It has also become more important due to the dramatic impact that modern human civilization is having on the world and the need to minimize negative effects (e.g. geohazards), along with the opportunities such observation provides to improve social and economic well-being.

See also

Digital terrain model
Environmental data
Earth observation satellite
First images of Earth from space
Geographic data
Group on Earth Observations
Global Earth Observation System of Systems
Landsat program
TerraSAR-X: a German Earth observation satellite
Radiant Earth Foundation: a non-profit organization applying machine learning for Earth observation
 
 
 
 Pale Orange Dot, a NASA digital model showing a possible early Earth
 
 
 
Extraterrestrial sky#Earth from Mars

References